Udayar may refer to:
Udayar (novel), a Tamil novel by Balakumaran
Udayar (title), a title or surname found in India
Udayar (caste), a community found in Tamil Nadu